Live at Newport is a live album by American singer and musician Joan Baez, released in 1996. It includes performance from 1963, 1964 and 1965 at the Newport Folk Festival in Newport, Rhode Island.

The final two tracks are duets with Bob Dylan.

Track listings 
 "Farewell, Angelina" (Bob Dylan) – 3:41
 "Long Black Veil" (Marijohn Wilkin, Danny Dill) – 3:11
 "Wild Mountain Thyme" (Francis McPeake) - 4:48
 "Come All You Fair and Tender Maidens" (Public Domain) - 3:57
 "Lonesome Valley" (Traditional) - 3:39
 "Hush Little Baby" (Public Domain) – 1:07
 "Te Ador/Te Manha" (Jungnickle, Traditional) – 3:57
 "All My Trials" (Traditional) - 4:38
 "It's All Over Now, Baby Blue" (Dylan) – 3:55
 "The Unquiet Grave" (Traditional) - 3:03
 "Oh, Freedom" (Traditional) - 3:15
 "Satisfied Mind" (Jack Rhodes) - 3:13
 "Fennario" (Public Domain) – 3:47
 "Don't Think Twice, It's All Right" (Dylan) – 3:37
 "Johnny Cuckoo" (Bessie Jones) – 4:28
 "It Ain't Me Babe" (Dylan) – 4:45
 "With God on Our Side" (Dylan) – 6:37

Personnel
Joan Baez – vocals, guitar
Charles Everett Lilly – bass
Bob Dylan – guitar, vocals
Peter Yarrow – guitar, vocals
Mary Travers – vocals

References

Joan Baez live albums
1996 live albums
Vanguard Records live albums